William Samuel Sitman  (August 9, 1923 – February 14, 1951) was a soldier in the United States Army during the Korean War. He posthumously received the Medal of Honor for his actions on February 14, 1951, during the Battle of Chipyong-ni.

Sitman joined the Army from his birthplace of Bellwood, Pennsylvania in February 1943.

Medal of Honor citation
Rank and organization: Sergeant First Class, U.S. Army, Company M, 23rd Infantry Regiment, 2nd Infantry Division

Place and date: Near Chipyong-ni, Korea, February 14, 1951

Entered service at: Bellwood, Pennsylvania, Birth: Bellwood, Pennsylvania

G.O. No.: 20, February 1, 1952

Citation:

Sfc. Sitman distinguished himself by conspicuous gallantry and intrepidity above and beyond the call of duty in action against an armed enemy of the United Nations. Sfc. Sitman, a machine gun section leader of Company M, was attached to Company I, under attack by a numerically superior hostile force. During the encounter when an enemy grenade knocked out his machine gun, a squad from Company I, immediately emplaced a light machine gun and Sfc. Sitman and his men remained to provide security for the crew. In the ensuing action, the enemy lobbed a grenade into the position and Sfc. Sitman, fully aware of the odds against him, selflessly threw himself on it, absorbing the full force of the explosion with his body. Although mortally wounded in this fearless display of valor, his intrepid act saved 5 men from death or serious injury, and enabled them to continue inflicting withering fire on the ruthless foe throughout the attack. Sfc. Sitman's noble self-sacrifice and consummate devotion to duty reflect lasting glory on himself and uphold the honored traditions of the military service.

See also

List of Medal of Honor recipients
List of Korean War Medal of Honor recipients

Notes

References

External links

1923 births
1951 deaths
People from Blair County, Pennsylvania
United States Army Medal of Honor recipients
American military personnel killed in the Korean War
Korean War recipients of the Medal of Honor
Deaths by hand grenade
United States Army non-commissioned officers
United States Army personnel of the Korean War